The Yarrow Later M class were a class of seven destroyers built for the Royal Navy that saw service during World War I. They were based on the preceding and successful Yarrow M class with minor alterations; notably reduced beam to compensate for increased displacement and a sloping stern. They were sometimes described as the Yarrow R class of destroyers.

Ships 
Four vessels were ordered in July 1915:
  – Laid down August 1915, launched 24 July 1916, completed September 1916. Sold for breaking up 5 November 1926.
  – Launched 30 September 1916 and completed late 1916.
  – Launched 25 November 1916 and completed 1916, torpedoed and sunk by German U-boat off Maas light ship on night of 22 December/23 December 1917.
  – Laid down August 1915, launched 5 February 1917, completed February 1917. Sold for breaking up 5 November 1926.

Three vessels were ordered in March 1916:
  – Laid down March 1916, launched 24 March 1917, completed May 1917. Sold for breaking up 29 April 1927.
  – Laid down March 1916, launched 19 May 1917, completed July 1917. Sold for breaking up April 1938.
  – Launched 4 August 1917 and completed 1917, torpedoed and sunk by German U-boat UC-17 off Dutch coast 15 August 1918.

Bibliography
Destroyers of the Royal Navy, 1893–1981, Maurice Cocker, 1983, Ian Allan 
Jane's Fighting Ships, 1919, Jane's Publishing

M class destroyer Yarrow Later
 
Ship classes of the Royal Navy